is a Japanese manga artist. In 2007, he won the 31st Kodansha Manga Award for shōnen manga for Dear Boys Act II.

Personal life 
Yagami was born in Kashiwazaki, Niigata, Japan.

Works
 Futari ni Omakase
 Dear Boys
 Dear Boys The Early Days
 Dear Boys Act II
 Dear Boys Act III
 G-Taste

References

Japanese erotic artists
Living people
Manga artists from Niigata Prefecture
Winner of Kodansha Manga Award (Shōnen)
Year of birth missing (living people)